Rachel Tidd (born May 20, 1984) is an American gymnast. She attended the 2001 World Gymnastics Championships where she received the bronze medal along with her team. She is an NCAA three time All American.

Personal life
Rachel Tidd is one of 10 children born to Susan and Michael Tidd. Her siblings are Mikala, Samantha, Olivia, Ashley, Holly, Nicole, Steven, Taylor and Brian.

Injury and Retirement
Tidd originally developed back pain during the 2004-2005 holiday break. She originally had thought that the back pain was just spasms. Doctors did many tests and procedures and were unable to determine what was causing Tidd's pain. Rehabilitation therapy helped briefly and delayed Tidd's decision to retire from gymnastics. Tidd made the choice to accept a medical scholarship which would not allow her to return to an athletic scholarship and retired in 2006.

NCAA Career Highlights

References

Living people
1984 births
American gymnasts
Sportspeople from Escondido, California
Medalists at the World Artistic Gymnastics Championships
U.S. women's national team gymnasts
21st-century American women